Thomas Lee (born 1876) was an English professional footballer who played as a wing half for Sunderland.

References

1876 births
People from Alnwick
Footballers from Northumberland
English footballers
Association football wing halves
Alnwick Town A.F.C. players
Sunderland A.F.C. players
Bristol Rovers F.C. players
Hebburn Argyle F.C. players
South Shields F.C. (1889) players
Millwall F.C. players
Ashington A.F.C. players
English Football League players
Year of death missing